Larry Brandenburg (born May 3, 1948) is an American actor. He has appeared in numerous television shows and films such as The Shawshank Redemption, Fargo, The Santa Clause and The Untouchables.

Filmography

External links
 

1948 births
Living people
American male telenovela actors
20th-century American male actors
American male film actors